Arto K. Salomaa (born 6 June 1934) is a Finnish mathematician and computer scientist.  His research career, which spans over forty years, is focused on formal languages and automata theory.

Early life and education
Salomaa was born in Turku, Finland on June 6, 1934. He earned a Bachelor's degree from the University of Turku in 1954 and a PhD from the same university in 1960. Salomaa's father was a professor of philosophy at the University of Turku. Salomaa was introduced to the theory of automata and formal languages during seminars at Berkeley given by John Myhill in 1957.

Career
In 1965, Salomaa became a professor of mathematics at the University of Turku, a position he retired from in 1999. He also spent two years in the late 1960s at the University of Western Ontario in London, Ontario, Canada, and two years in the 1970s at Aarhus University in Aarhus, Denmark.

Salomaa was president of the European Association for Theoretical Computer Science from 1979 until 1985.

Publications
Salomaa has authored or co-authored 46 textbooks, including Theory of Automata (1969), Formal Languages (1973), The Mathematical Theory of L-Systems (1980, with Grzegorz Rozenberg), Jewels of Formal Language Theory (1981) Public-Key Cryptography (1990) and DNA Computing (1998, with Grzegorz Rozenberg and Gheorghe Paun). With Rozenberg, Salomaa edited the Handbook of Formal Languages (1997), a 3-volume, 2000-page reference on formal language theory. These books have often become standard references in their respective areas. For example, Formal Languages was reported in 1991 to be among the 100 most cited texts in mathematics.

Salomaa has also published over 400 articles in scientific journals during his professional career. He has authored also non-scientific articles such as "What computer scientists should know about sauna". After his retirement, Arto Salomaa has published almost another 100 scientific articles.

Awards and recognition
Salomaa has been awarded the title of Academician by the Academy of Finland, one of twelve living Finnish individuals awarded the title. He also received the EATCS Award in 2004. Salomaa has received seven honorary degrees. On June 13, 2013, Salomaa was awarded a Doctor Honoris Causa from the University of Western Ontario.

Personal life
Salomaa married in 1959. He has two children, Kirsti and Kai, the latter of whom is a professor of Computer Science at Queen's University at Kingston and also works in the field of formal languages and automata theory.

References

External links

Arto Salomaa home page

1934 births
Living people
People from Turku
University of Turku alumni
Academic staff of the University of Turku
Academic staff of the University of Western Ontario
Academic staff of Aarhus University
Finnish mathematicians
Finnish computer scientists
Members of the Finnish Academy of Science and Letters
Members of Academia Europaea